Konrad Wallenrod is an 1828 narrative poem, in Polish, by Adam Mickiewicz, set in the 14th-century Grand Duchy of Lithuania.

Mickiewicz wrote it, while living in St. Petersburg, Russia, in protest against the late-18th-century partitions of the Polish–Lithuanian Commonwealth by the Russian Empire, the Kingdom of Prussia, and the Habsburg monarchy.

Mickiewicz had been exiled to St. Petersburg for his participation in the Philomaths organization at Vilnius University.

The poem helped inspire the Lithuanian and Polish November 1830 Uprising against Russian rule. Though its subversive theme was apparent to most readers, the poem escaped censorship due to conflicts among the censors and, in the second edition, a prefatory homage to Tsar Nicholas I. Though Mickiewicz later disparaged the work, its cultural influence in Poland persists.

Plot
In a preface, Mickiewicz briefly outlines the history of the region, describing the interactions among the Lithuanians, Prussians, Poles, and Russians. The following six cantos tell the story of Wallenrod, a fictional Lithuanian pagan captured and reared as a Christian by his people's long-standing enemies, the Order of Teutonic Knights. He rises to the position of Grand Master, but is awakened to his heritage by a mysterious minstrel singing at an entertainment event. He then seeks vengeance by deliberately leading the Knights into a major military defeat. It transpires that Wallenrod has a wife, Aldona, who has been living in seclusion. The Knights discover his treason and sentence him to death; Aldona refuses to flee with him. He then commits suicide.

Cultural influences

The concept of "Wallenrodism"—the striking of a treacherous, possibly suicidal, blow against an enemy—and certain powerful fragments of the poem have become an enduring part of the Lithuanian and Polish psyche and found resonance in the independence struggles of the two nations in the 19th (1831, 1863) and 20th centuries. The poem included a reference to Machiavelli's dictum that a leader must be both a lion and a fox. Its encouragement of what would later be called "patriotic treason" created controversy, since its elements of deception and conspiracy were thought incompatible with Christian and chivalric values. Mickiewicz was taken aback by the strength of the public response to his poem and regretted its publication; before his death, he expressed frustration at his financial inability to buy back and burn every copy of what he described as a mere "political pamphlet."

Konrad Wallenrod has twice been turned into an opera:  as I Lituani (The Lithuanians), by Italian composer Amilcare Ponchielli (1874); and as Konrad Wallenrod,  by Polish composer Władysław Żeleński (1885). The Polish composer Frédéric Chopin may have based his Ballade No.1 in G minor on this poem.

The Polish author Joseph Conrad, who had been christened Józef Teodor Konrad Korzeniowski, may have selected the second part of his pen name as an hommage to the poem's protagonist. Mickiewicz's poem influenced Conrad's frequent explorations of the conflict between publicly attested loyalty and a hidden affiliation with a national cause.

See also 
 Romanticism in Poland
 Konrad von Wallenrode
 List of Poles
 1828 in poetry
 Kordian

References

External links
  English translation of Konrad Wallenrod. M.A. Biggs, 1882.

1828 poems
Polish poems
State of the Teutonic Order
Lithuania in fiction
Works by Adam Mickiewicz